Lorely Rodriguez (born October 19, 1989),  known professionally as Empress Of, is a Honduran-American singer, songwriter, musician and record producer based in Los Angeles, California. To date, she has released three studio albums via XL Recordings and Terrible Records, her critically acclaimed debut, Me (2015), Us (2018) and I'm Your Empress Of (2020).

Career

2011–2016: Early releases, Systems and Me
After completing a sound engineering degree at Boston's Berklee College of Music in 2011, Rodriguez moved to New York City and quickly broke into the local music scene performing in a Brooklyn-based band with Sam Owens called "Celestial Shore" but soon left the group to focus on her own music.

In 2012, Rodriguez initially gained attention for anonymously releasing a series of one minute-long demos (via YouTube) prefaced only by a solid color entitled "Colorminutes". Her first 7" single, "Champagne" was released soon after on November 5, 2012, through a limited run via No Recordings. Lorely's stage name was inspired by a tarot card reading she did with a friend: "The first card he pulled out was an Empress card and I was like, 'It's me, I am Empress.' [...] the Empress card is connected to fertility and mothering and strength. It's kind of nice to have those feelings."

On April 2, 2013, her bilingual four-track EP "Systems" was released via Double Denim and Terrible Records in the UK and North America respectively. Since the release of her EP, she's showcased at SXSW, Iceland Airwaves and Pitchfork's Summer Music Festival and toured as a support act with the likes of Jamie Lidell, Jungle, Kimbra and Florence and the Machine.

During 2013, Rodriguez signed to British independent label, XL Recordings via a joint deal through Terrible  and began to work on material for her debut album, while living in Brooklyn. A few weeks into writing, Rodriguez decided to embark on a retreat to Mexico, following a friend's offer to stay at their parent's vacant vacation home in Valle de Bravo. After finding New York's surrounding environment was negatively effecting what she had produced thus far, the isolation of the trip allowed Rodriguez to be fully introspective and truly begin the writing and pre-production for her debut at the end of 2013. The rest of additional writing and production would continue back in New York over the course of 2014.

On April 14, 2015, "Water Water", the first single off her unannounced debut full-length was released via XL/Terrible. A Spanish version of the track, "Agua Agua" was released soon after on June 8, 2015, exclusively via SoundCloud. The reasoning behind this alternative version being, a way for Rodriguez's mother to connect and listen to her daughter's music.

On June 20, 2015, the album's second single, "Kitty Kat" was released alongside the announcement of her debut, Me which was released on September 11, 2015, via XL Recordings and Terrible. The remaining singles that preceded the album's announcement were "How Do You Do It"  and "Standard" released respectively in September 2015. On Aug 31, 2015, Rodriguez also released a cover of Katy Perry's song, "Hot n Cold" via SoundCloud for Rookie Magazine's "Theme Song" series.

The album was met with critical acclaim from mainstream critics and peaked at number five on Billboard's Top Dance/Electronic Albums chart upon its release. A majority of publications, praised Rodriguez's emotional vulnerability to create such an intensely personal album while, also highlighting the direct approach of her unique songwriting and experimental production compared to the layered opaqueness of her earlier work. Following its release, Rodriguez toured the UK and North America throughout Fall 2015 in promotion of the album with Awful Records artist, ABRA and Canadian electronic duo, Purity Ring respectively.

The video for the album's fifth single, "Icon" was released November 16, 2015 via Urban Outfitters UO Video Series.

"Woman is a Word", a b-side from the album was released on Mar 14, 2016  and would be later added to a deluxe version of Me released as a limited edition cassette during her 2016 UK & European Tour via XL/Terrible.

2017–2019: Us

Following the release of "Me", Rodriguez relocated back to Los Angeles from New York, with the goal of collaborating with musical contemporaries, while also maintaining a closer proximity to family and reconnecting with her hometown roots.

During 2017, Rodriguez released a standalone single, "Go to Hell" on July 12. 2017 via Terrible that was co-written with former Chairlift vocalist, Caroline Polachek. She also featured on two singles for Los Angeles producers, DJDS with the Billboard-charting "Why Don't You Come On" additionally featuring El Paso R&B singer, Khalid and a cover of Lana Del Rey's Lust for Life single, "Love" released on August 29, 2017, and December 1, 2017, respectively through Loma Vista Recordings for their third studio album, Big Wave More Fire.

On April 11, 2018, double single "Trust Me Baby / In Dreams" premiered on Zane Lowe's Apple Music "Beats 1" radio show and released via Terrible. The former was co-produced by Cole M.G.N..

On August 20, 2018, Rodriguez's announced her second studio album, Us, which was released on October 19, 2018, via XL/Terrible. The album's second single, "When I’m With Him" was released a few days after the announcement on August 22, 2018. The song would later be featured on the soundtrack of the video game eFootball Pro Evolution Soccer 2020.

The album's third and fourth singles, "Love For Me" and "I Don't Even Smoke Weed" were released September 26 and October 18, 2018, respectively prior to the album. She would feature on the title track of Khalid's first EP, "Suncity", which was also released on October 19, 2018, via RCA Records.

With the release of "Us", Rodriguez embarked on an international headlining tour with opening support from Colombian electronic duo, Salt Cathedral on the North American leg of the tour and a string of summer music festivals including Sideways, Primavera Sound and Meow Wolf Vortex Music Festival throughout 2019. She concluded the rest of that year featuring on Australian producer, Kito's single, "Wild Girl" released September 27, 2019 via UMG Recordings and touring as support acts for Maggie Rogers' Heard It in a Past Life and Lizzo's Cuz I Love You Too U.S. Fall tours respectively.

2020–2021: I'm Your Empress Of and becoming independent with Major Arcana
On April 12, 2020, Rodriguez's released her third studio album, I'm Your Empress Of via XL Recordings and Terrible. The album was preceded by the single, "Give Me Another Chance" released and premiered March 3. 2020 via Zane Lowe's Apple Music "Beats 1" radio. Due to the 2020 COVID-19 crisis, no touring or live performances could be done to promote the album.

During 2020, Rodriguez founded and announced the start her own record label, Major Arcana via partnering with US-based artist management company, mtheory. The announcement marked the fulfilment of her contracts with XL Recordings and Terrible Records respectively, thus allowing all future releases to be fully independent under her own brand.

On October 27, 2020, Rodriguez released her first single via Major Arcana, "You've Got To Feel" featuring Grammy nominated singer/songwriter, Amber Mark while subsequently releasing another single, "Broken" for the soundtrack of the Amazon Prime Video series, The Wilds on Nov 20, 2020.

During 2021, Rodriguez was featured on American singer/producer, MNDR's single "Love in Reverse" released March 31, 2021, off her second studio album, "Hell To Be You Baby" via Watersound Records.

On April 30, 2021, Rodriguez announced partnering with an Ad Council-backed national campaign called "Sound It Out Together". The purpose of the campaign being, to highlight youth mental health and create an outlet for adolescent school children of color, to express their emotions and experiences through music.

With assistance from professional songwriters (Rodriguez, KAMAUU, Lauren Jauregui and Tobe Nwigwe respectively), the subjects of discussion between the artists and the children featured were turned into fully produced songs and released as compilation EP for the campaign via Mass Appeal.

Rodriguez's involvement included the single, "One Breath", a collaboration w/ a 14-year-old girl named Marianne on their shared experience of both being first-generation Latin Americans and balancing that duality or double consciousness through daily life.

2022–present: Save Me 
On Apr 8, 2022, Rodriguez premiered "Save Me", the first single from her forthcoming EP of the same name, which was released on June 24, 2022, via her independent imprint, Major Arcana.

The announcement of the EP, produced by Rodriguez with additional production from frequent collaborator, BJ Burton and Johan Lennox was made through the release of the second single, "Dance For You" on May 25, 2022. On Jun 7, 2022, Rodriguez was announced as the main support for Carly Rae Jepsen's "So Nice" North American tour which proceeded during Fall 2022.

A remix EP of "Dance For You" was released November 18, 2022, featuring remixes/edits of the single by Blue Hawaii, DJ Kirby, DJ Python, Nick León and Sassy 009 respectively.

In 2023, Rodriguez provided tour support as the opening act for Japanese–British singer, Rina Sawayama throughout the European leg of her "Hold the Girl" World Tour during February 2023.

Personal life 
Rodriguez is a first-generation Honduran American. She was raised by her mother, Reyna in the Los Angeles metropolitan area, and her father Adán, one of the original pianists and founding members of the Honduran Latin music ensemble, Banda Blanca. Lorely's first experiences with music were listening to her father's cassette tapes of the Beatles and Pet Shop Boys. Rodriguez has a degree from Berklee College of Music in Boston. She cites Julee Cruise, Elizabeth Fraser of the Cocteau Twins, the Zombies, and the Beach Boys as some of her musical inspirations.

Discography

Studio albums
Me (2015)
Us (2018)
I'm Your Empress Of (2020)

Extended plays
Systems (2013)
Tristeza (2014)
Save Me (2022)
Dance For You (Remixes) (2022)

Mixtapes
Colorminutes (2013)

Singles

As lead artist

As featured artist

Remixes

References

External links
Official website
SoundCloud

1989 births
Living people
American people of Honduran descent
American women pop singers
American women singer-songwriters
Spanish-language singers of the United States
21st-century American women singers
21st-century American singers
American singer-songwriters